Dumfregia is a genus of prehistoric lobe-finned fish which lived during the Carboniferous period.

References

Carboniferous bony fish
Prehistoric bony fish genera
Rhabdodermatidae
Carboniferous fish of Europe